Rhyse is an unincorporated community in Dent County, in the U.S. state of Missouri.

History
A post office called Rhyse was established in 1920, and remained in operation until 1954. The community has the first name of Rhyse Jeffries, the grandson of a resident.

References

Unincorporated communities in Dent County, Missouri
Unincorporated communities in Missouri